Pete Williams (born 1960) is an English singer/songwriter and musician, known for his work with Dexys Midnight Runners, The Bureau and These Tender Virtues. He is an original member of Dexys Midnight Runners and played on the number one single "Geno".

Williams played on the 2012 album One Day I'm Going to Soar by Dexys and sang with frontman Kevin Rowland on the Jools' Annual Hootenanny TV show on 31 December 2012. He also sang with them on The Acoustic Stage at Glastonbury Festival 2014.

He was a special guest for The Proclaimers on their tour in 2019 and The Specials on their UK tour in 2021.

After playing during the building of the new Jennifer Blackwell Performance Space at Symphony Hall, Birmingham in June 2020, Williams performed there with his full band in January 2022, four months after it was opened by Prince Edward, Earl of Wessex.

Discography

Albums
See (Basehart Recordings, 2012)
Roughnecks + Roustabouts (Basehart Recordings, 2015)
The Pete Williams Band Live At Yellow Arch Sheffield 20/3/15 (Pledge Music, 2015)
Midnight Music (Undiscovered Classics, 2009; recorded 1979–1982)
H.O.L.L.A.N.D (Basehart Recordings, 2018)

References

External links

1960 births
English bass guitarists
English male singers
Dexys Midnight Runners members
Living people